Österfärnebo IF is a Swedish football club located in Österfärnebo.

Background
Österfärnebo IF currently plays in Division 4 Gestrikland which is the sixth tier of Swedish football. They play their home matches at the Solliden in Österfärnebo.

The club is affiliated to Gestriklands Fotbollförbund. Österfärnebo IF have competed in the Svenska Cupen on 4 occasions and have played 4 matches in the competition.

Season to season

Footnotes

External links
 Österfärnebo IF – Official website
 Österfärnebo IF on Facebook

Football clubs in Gävleborg County